Sarykum or Sary-Kum (meaning "Yellow sand") is a large sand dune located in the Kumtorkalinsky District of Dagestan, Russian Federation. It is one of the largest sand dunes in Eurasia. The dune is located in a protected area, part of the Dagestan Nature Reserve, which was established on 9 January 1987.

Geography
Sarykum is the highest dune of the Sarykumskye Barchany dune area, which extends below the northern slopes of the Narat-Tyube Range.

The Sarykum dune is very old.

Flora
The Sarykum area is a refuge for desert flora in the region. There are up to 279 species of rare plants, including several which are endemic, such as Iris acutiloba, Shishkin's groundsel (Senecio schischkinii),  Karakugen milkvetch, Astragalus karakugensis and Colchicum laetum.

References

External links

Sarykum Sand Dune on Vimeo 

Landforms of Dagestan
Dunes of Russia